Thapathana  is one of the Ward of Phalewas Municipality of Gandaki Province established by the current constitution of Nepal which was promulgated on 20 September 2015. It was renamed as ward no. 2 of Phalewas Municipality. At the time of the 1991 Nepal census, it had a population of 3263 people living in 639 individual households.

References

External links
UN map of the municipalities of Parbat District

Populated places in Parbat District